The Colombia women's national rugby sevens team participates at several international tournaments. Colombia qualified for the 2016 Summer Olympics. Their biggest achievement is the bronze medal won at the Lima 2019 Pan American Games.

Colombia placed second at the 2019 Sudamérica Olympic Qualifying Tournament in Peru, earning them a place at the final qualification tournament. They were knocked out of the Qualifier semi-finals at the 2020 Final Olympic Qualification Tournament by France. Colombia qualified for their first Sevens World Cup after finishing as runners-up at the 2021 Sudamérica Rugby Women's Sevens. The 2022 Rugby World Cup Sevens will be held in South Africa.

Tournament history

Summer Olympics

Rugby World Cup Sevens

Pan American Games

South American Championship
2004 - 3rd
2005 - 4th
2007 - 2nd
2008 - 5th
2009 - 5th
2010 - 2nd
2011 - 5th
2012 - 2nd
2013 - 5th
2014 - 4th
2015 - 1st
2016 - 3rd
2017 (Villa Carlos Paz) - 3rd
2018 - 3rd
2019 (Lima) - 2nd
2019 (Montevideo) - 3rd
2020 - 3rd
2021 - 2nd

Players

Previous squad

References

External links
Official website
WorldRugby profile

Rugby
Women's national rugby sevens teams
Rugby union in Colombia